Blood and Aphorisms is the first EP by the band As Tall as Lions which was self-released in 2002.  Some of the songs were later re-recorded for the album Lafcadio.

Track listing
"Break Blossom"*
"Dancing in the Rearview"
"And the Wick Burnt Black"* (re-recorded as "Ghost in Drag")
"A Fighting Word"
"If I'm Not Out Burning"*
"Goodnite, Noises Everywhere"*

* = re-recorded for Lafcadio.

References

2002 debut EPs
As Tall as Lions albums